Albalat dels Tarongers is a municipality in the comarca of Camp de Morvedre in the Valencian Community, Spain.

Notable people
 Ángel Casero, former cyclist

References

Municipalities in the Province of Valencia
Camp de Morvedre
Bien de Interés Cultural landmarks in the Province of Valencia